The willow flycatcher (Empidonax traillii) is a small insect-eating, neotropical migrant bird of the tyrant flycatcher family. There are four subspecies of the willow flycatcher currently recognized, all of which breed in North America (including three subspecies that breed in California). Empidonax flycatchers are almost impossible to tell apart in the field so biologists use their songs to distinguish between them. The binomial commemorates the Scottish zoologist Thomas Stewart Traill.

Description and ecology
Adults have brown-olive upperparts, darker on the wings and tail, with whitish underparts; they have an indistinct white eye ring, white wing bars and a small bill. The breast is washed with olive-gray. The upper part of the bill is gray; the lower part is orangish. At one time, this bird and the alder flycatcher (Empidonax alnorum) were considered to be a single species, Traill's flycatcher. The willow and alder flycatchers were considered the same species until the 1970s. Their song is the only reliable method to tell them apart in the field .

Their breeding habitat is deciduous thickets, especially willows and often near water, across the United States and southern Canada. They make a cup nest in a vertical fork in a shrub or tree.

These neotropical birds migrate to Mexico and Central America, and in small numbers as far south as Ecuador in South America, often selecting winter habitat near water. Willow flycatchers travel approximately  each way between wintering and breeding areas.

They wait on a perch near the top of a shrub and fly out to catch insects in flight, also sometimes picking insects from foliage while hovering. They may eat some berries.

This bird's song is a sneezed fitz-bew. The call is a dry whit.

This bird competes for habitat with the alder flycatcher where their ranges overlap.

Food resources 
Willow flycatcher feed on insects, and common hoverflies Syritta pipiens have been found in their fecal samples.

Subspecies
The subspecies are best distinguished from each other by their songs. In addition, the four subspecies have significant genetic differences based on mitochondrial DNA analysis. Their winter ranges have been elucidated using mitochondrial DNA genetic studies of 172 birds sampled in winter combined with plumage coloration and morphological differences.

The four subspecies of the willow flycatcher are:

E. t. brewsteri – Little willow flycatcher
The little willow flycatcher (E.t. brewsteri) is the Pacific slope subspecies of the willow flycatcher. Described by Oberholser in 1918, it breeds in California from Tulare County north along the western side of the Sierra Nevada, and in Oregon and Washington west of the Cascade range.

E.t. adastus
The Great Basin/Northern Rockies subspecies of the willow flycatcher (E. t. adastus) breeds in California east of the Sierra/Cascade axis, from the Oregon border into Modoc County and possibly into northern Inyo County. Populations at high elevation just east of the Sierra Nevada crest but south of Modoc County are assumed to be E. t. brewsteri. There has been very little study of E. t. adastus in California. It was described by Oberholser in 1932.

E. t. extimus – Southwestern willow flycatcher
The southwestern willow flycatcher (E. t. extimus) is a federally endangered subspecies and it is known to be found in Arizona, California, Colorado, Nevada, New Mexico, Texas, and Utah. It was listed in 1995, at which time it was known to breed at only about 75 sites in riparian areas throughout the American southwest. The known breeding population was estimated at between 300 and 500 pairs.

The largest remaining population in California is on the South Fork Kern River, Kern County. In southern California, this subspecies breeds on the San Luis Rey River, at Camp Pendleton, the Santa Margarita River and Pilgrim, De Luz, French, and Las Flores creeks; as well as on the Santa Ynez River. In 1996, breeding was confirmed along the Arizona side of the lower Colorado River at Lake Mead Delta and at Topock Marsh. Examination of museum specimens of 578 migrating and wintering E. t. extimus indicating that Guatemala to Costa Rica constitutes the main winter range. This species is experiencing population declines throughout the Southwest due to habitat loss/alteration and invasive species. 

Saltcedar (Tamarix ramosissima) is an invasive species found throughout the Southwest and has replaced essential vegetation, by outcompeting native species, in riparian areas where the Southwest Willow flycatcher is found, which could be a contributing factor in this species decline. In two sites, one in Arizona and the other in New Mexico, native trees were able to replace patches of tamarix and populations of willow flycatchers increased. It was documented that in these sites 90% of the willow flycatcher's nests were found in native vegetation, only 10% were in mixed vegetation (native species and Saltcedar) and few were in areas dominated by Saltcedar. However, it's important to note that because willow flycatchers can and do breed, in some locations, within Saltcedar habitat it can serve as vital habitat in the recovery of this species.

The San Pedro River Preserve was purchased by the Nature Conservancy to preserve habitat for this subspecies. North American beavers (Castor canadensis) are thought to play a critical role in widening riparian width, openings in dense vegetation, and retention of surface water through the willow flycatcher breeding season. This subspecies was described by A.R. Phillips in 1948.

E. t. traillii
The eastern nominate subspecies of the willow flycatcher (E. t. traillii) was described by Audubon in 1828. It breeds from the eastern coast of the United States to the western Rocky Mountains.

References

External links 

 
 
 
 
 
 
 

willow flycatcher
Birds of North America
Native birds of Western Canada
Native birds of Eastern Canada
Birds of the United States
willow flycatcher
Willow flycatcher